The Premier Motor Manufacturing Company built the brass era and vintage Premier luxury automobile in Indianapolis, Indiana, from 1903 to 1925.

History
The Premier Motor Manufacturing Company was organized in 1903 by George A. Weidely and Harold O. Smith in Indianapolis, Indiana. The company began automobile production with an advanced design air-cooled engine designed by Weidely.

Early Models 
The 1904 four-cylinder Premier was a touring car model.  Equipped with a tonneau, it could seat six passengers and sold for $1,400, .  The vertically mounted water-cooled straight-4, situated at the front of the car, produced 40 hp (30 kW).  A three-speed sliding transmission was fitted as on Système Panhard cars from Europe.  The pressed steel-framed car weighed 2250 lb (1021 kg) and used semi-elliptic springs.  A two-cylinder Premier model sold for $2,500. It had a 2-stroke straight-twin engine producing 20 hp (15 kW). 

Carl Fisher, who later founded the Indianapolis Motor Speedway, had ambitions of contesting the Vanderbilt Cup, and in 1905 George Weidely built an  air-cooled prototype Premier race car for him.  Unfortunately the car was disqualified for being 60 pounds overweight, but had tested at doing a quarter mile in 10 seconds.

During 1906, the Model F and Model L were on the market with prices that ranged from $1,250 to $2,250, . The cars were advertised as summer and winter vehicles that had a "powerful motor, easy but substantial clutch, buoyant springs and luxurious upholstering."

For 1907, Premier rationalized to one Model 24 with a 24-hp four-cylinder engine and premium pricing from $2,250 to $3,250. Engines and wheelbase sized increased annually and in 1908 a 55-hp six-cylinder Model 45 was introduced on a 124-inch wheelbase priced at $3,750, .  Weidely developed a water-cooled engine in 1907 and from 1908 all Premiers were water-cooled.

Major Production 
From producing 25 cars in 1903 production double annually until 250 cars were produced in 1907. The Premier cars, with their large green oak leaf on the radiator badge (often cited as the first use of an emblem as an automotive trademark), built a reputation as builders of superb touring cars. By 1910, they had completed three Glidden tours with a perfect score and reach 1,000 annual production.

By 1913 all Premiers were six-cylinder cars with prices ranging from $2,735 for a roadster to $6,000 for a Deluxe Touring model.  In 1914 the company went into receivership and George Weidely and Harold Smith left the company.  In the reorganization that followed, Weidely and Smith purchased the Premier engine factory and established Weidely Motors Company for the manufacturing of automobile engines.  An Illinois banker named F. W. Woodruff, headed a syndicate that arranged to pay the Premier company's debts and set-up the Premier Motor Car Company.  

During the First World War demand for the FWD Model B all wheel drive truck was too great for the Four Wheel Drive Auto Company to meet, so Premier was engaged along with the Peerless Motor Company, Kissel Motor Car Company and Mitchell Motor Car Company to build the Model B under license.  One Model B was assembled by Premier in Indianapolis using parts from all four manufacturers to demonstrate that all parts were truly interchangeable.  Premier also built 500 FWDs for the British Army in 1916.

In 1916, the  Indianapolis Motor Speedway, due to the war in Europe, asked Premier to enter racers for the Indianapolis 500. Three factory prepared cars were entered, one finished seventh, the second crashed, the third went out with a broken oil line.

For 1918 Premier introduced a new car with the tag line "The Aluminum Six with Magnetic Gear Shift". The 65-hp aluminum block engine was designed by Weidely Motors and the electric transmission was made by Cutler-Hammer.  The Model 6C was priced from $2,285 to $3,285, .

Decline 
Prices would climb back to the $4,000 range but production slowed and never recovered to their earlier levels.  L. S. Skelton, an Oklahoma physician who had made a fortune in oil, paid off the latest Premier indebtedness and reorganized as the Premier Motor Corporation in 1920.  Unfortunately, Skelton died in January of 1921.  After the 1920-21 Depression, the company emerged from a friendly receivership in 1923, when Frederick L. Barrows of Connersville, Indiana took over and reorganized as Premier Motors, Inc.  In 1923 Frederick Barrows of Premier purchased the Monroe automobile company and Monroes became the Premier Model B for 1923.

In 1923, Frederick Barrows received a contract for the building of 1,000 Premier taxicabs, and from 1924 this would be Premiers only product.  In October of 1926  Premier Motors, Inc. sold out to the National Cab & Truck Company of Indianapolis, which very quickly went out of business.

Advertisements

See also
Remaining examples of Premier automobiles are rather rare. A 1905 Premier race car is on display in the Speedway Museum in Indianapolis and a 1918 Premier is on display at Space Farms Zoo and Museum in Sussex, New Jersey.  A 1916 Premier is on display at the Auburn Cord Duesenberg Automobile Museum in Auburn, Indiana.
 Premier Automobiles at ConceptCarz
 Carl Fishers World Beater at TheOldMotor
 For Sale: One Slightly Used Racing Car- TheOldMotor
 Frank Leslie's Popular Monthly (January, 1904)

References

Defunct motor vehicle manufacturers of the United States
Manufacturing companies based in Indianapolis
Motor vehicle manufacturers based in Indiana
Defunct manufacturing companies based in Indiana
Vehicle manufacturing companies established in 1903
Vehicle manufacturing companies disestablished in 1926
Luxury motor vehicle manufacturers
Luxury vehicles
Brass Era vehicles
Vintage vehicles
1900s cars
1910s cars
1920s cars
Cars introduced in 1904